The 6th constituency of Budapest is one of the single member constituencies of the National Assembly, the national legislature of Hungary. The constituency standard abbreviation: Budapest 06. OEVK.

Since 2018, it has been represented by Máté Kocsis of the Fidesz–KDNP party alliance.

Geography
The 6th constituency is located in central-western part of Pest.

The constituency borders with 5th- and 8th constituency to the north, 9th constituency to the east, 16th constituency to the southeast, and 17th constituency to the southwest, 18th-, 2nd- and 1st constituency to the west.

List of districts
The constituency includes the following municipalities:

 District VIII.: Main part of the district (except Palotanegyed).
 District IX.: Main part of the district (except Belső-Ferencváros).

History
The 6th constituency of Budapest was created in 2011 and contained of the pre-2011 abolished constituencies of the part of 11th, 12th and 13th constituency of the capital. Its borders have not changed since its creation.

Members
The constituency was first represented by Imre Vas of the Fidesz from 2014 to 2018. Máté Kocsis of the Fidesz was elected in 2018.

In 2022, the constituency was won by András Jámbor of the left-wing Spark Movement, running on the unified opposition platform.

Election result

2022 election

2018 election

2014 election

References

Budapest 6th